Castrezzato is a comune in the province of Brescia, in Lombardy, northern Italy. It is located in the plain between the rivers Oglio and Mella, 
The Autodromo di Franciacorta is nearby.

References

Cities and towns in Lombardy
Municipalities of the Province of Brescia